Aubrey J. Givens (June 21, 1912 – September 16, 1983) was an American football and basketball coach.  He was the 24th head football coach at Doane College in Crete, Nebraska, serving for one season, in 1952 and compiling a record of 4–5.  Givens was also the head basketball coach at Doane from 1952 to 1955, tallying a mark of 20–52.

Head coaching record

Football

References

External links
 

1912 births
1983 deaths
Basketball coaches from Nebraska
Doane Tigers football coaches
Doane Tigers men's basketball coaches